Kalavad is one of the 182 Legislative Assembly constituencies of Gujarat state in India. It is part of Jamnagar district and is reserved for candidates belonging to the Scheduled Castes.

List of segments
This assembly seat represents the following segments,

 Kalavad Taluka
 Jodiya Taluka (Part) Villages – Ranjitpar, Untbet-Shampar, Zinzuda, Rajpar, Fadsar, Bela, Rampar (Padabekad), Kothariya, Amran, Kharachiya, Kerali, Fatsar, Jivapar, Badanpar (Amran), Dhudkot, Mavnugam, Dudhai, Manamora, Bhimkata, Jamsar, Sampar, Ambala, Koyli, Padana, Jiragadh, Tarana, Madhapar, Balambha, Keshiya, Manpar, Morana, Meghpar, Jasapar, Bodka, Pithad, Gajdi, Rasnal, Timbdi.
 Dhrol Taluka – Entire taluka except villages – Chhalla, Golita.
 Paddhari Taluka (Part) of Rajkot District Villages – Khokhri, Jivapar.

Members of Vidhan Sabha 
 1985 - Keshubhai Patel (BJP)   
2007 - Ranchhodbhai Faldu, Bharatiya Janata Party
2012 - Meghjibhai Chavda, Bharatiya Janata Party

Election results

2022

2017

2012

See also
 List of constituencies of Gujarat Legislative Assembly
 Jamnagar district

References

External links
 

Assembly constituencies of Gujarat
Jamnagar district